The Volusia gens was an ancient Roman family.

Members
 Marcus Volusius, aedile 43 BC; he had been proscribed, but managed to escape in sacerdotal vestments borrowed from a friend who was a votary of the goddess Isis.
 Volusius Vorenius, a centurion associated with Julius Caesar 
 Volusius, an annalist mentioned in the poetry of Catullus
 Volusius Proculus, assassinated empress Agrippina and associated with Epicharis of the Pisonian conspiracy of 65
 Lucius Volusius Maecianus, jurist in the second century and father-in-law of the usurper Avidius Cassius
 Volusia Vettia Maeciana, wife of the usurper Avidius Cassius
 Quintus Volusius Flaccus Cornelianus, consul of 174
 Volusius Venustus, politician of the fourth century
 Lucius Volusius Successus, whose mausoleum is underneath the Vatican Necropolis

Volusii Saturnini
 Quintus Volusius (Saturninus), prefect of Cicero from 51 BC to 50 BC, married Claudia the aunt of emperor Tiberius
 Lucius Volusius Saturninus, cousin of emperor Tiberius and suffect consul of 12 BC
 Volusia Saturnina, daughter of the consul and mother of empress Lollia Paulina
 Lucius Volusius Saturninus, suffect consul in AD 3 and lived over 90 years from 38 BC-AD 56
 Lucius Volusius Saturninus, a member of the College of Pontiffs who died in 55
 Quintus Volusius Saturninus, consul of 56 
 Volusia Cornelia, daughter of Quintus Volusius Saturninus consul of 56
 Lucius Volusius Saturninus, Augur and Suffect consul who lived in ca. 80 
 Lucius Volusius Saturninus, consul of 87
 Quintus Volusius Saturninus, consul of 92

See also
 List of Roman gentes
 Licinia Cornelia Volusia Torquata

References

 
Roman gentes